Volzhsky is a rural locality (a settlement) and the administrative center of Srednevolzhsky Selsoviet of Yenotayevsky District, Astrakhan Oblast, Russia. The population was 1,771 as of 2010. There are 24 streets.

Geography 
Volzhsky is located 65 km southeast of Yenotayevka (the district's administrative centre) by road. Seroglazka is the nearest rural locality.

References 

Rural localities in Yenotayevsky District